Marinus "Rini" Wagtmans (born 26 December 1946 in Sint Willebrord) is a former Dutch professional road bicycle racer. He was the nephew of Wout Wagtmans, a former professional who had won the Tour de Romandie stage race in 1952. His father was a masseur while Tour de France stage winner Wim van Est was his neighbour.  In 1968 Rini turned professional. The following year he finished third overall in the 1969 Vuelta a España. He rode four editions of the Tour de France and won three stages, one in 1970, one in 1971 and one in 1972. In the 1970 Tour de France he finished fifth overall. In 1971 Tour de France while riding for Molteni, he wore the yellow jersey as leader of the general classification for one day but teammate and team leader Eddy Merckx took the jersey the following day. He also won two stages in the 1970 Vuelta a España.  Wagtmans was known as one of the best descenders in the peloton. His hair earned him the nickname "witte bles", which translates as "white blaze". Wagtmans ended his career early due to heart problems. Afterwards he was a cycling coach, a member for the Royal Dutch Cycling Union, and then a successful businessman. In 2005, Wagtmans was invested as a Knight of the Order of Orange-Nassau. In 2006, Wagtmans’ biography was published.

Major results

1966
Ronde van Midden-Zeeland
1967
Tour of Austria
1968
Roosendaal (NED)
Acht van Chaam
1969
Sint-Willebrord
Ulvenhout
Kortenhoef
Tour de France:
6th place overall classification
1970
Vuelta a España:
Winner stages 11 and 13
Koksijde
Tour de France:
Winner stage 15
5th place overall classification
Plumeliau
1971
Sint-Willebrord
Tour de France:
Winner stage 3
Wearing yellow jersey for one day
Acht van Chaam
1972
Tour de France:
Winner stage 18

See also
 List of Dutch cyclists who have led the Tour de France general classification

References

External links 

1946 births
Living people
Dutch male cyclists
Dutch Tour de France stage winners
Dutch Vuelta a España stage winners
Cyclists from Rucphen
Knights of the Order of Orange-Nassau
UCI Road World Championships cyclists for the Netherlands